This is a list of animated television programs that have been produced by France. It includes series made by France alone, as well as those produced in collaboration with various other countries. For live action French series, see: List of French television series.

Adult

Adventure

Comedy

Comedy-drama

Fantasy

Mystery/detective

Pre-School

Shortcom

Spy

Superheroes

Supernatural/sci-fi

Western

See also
 List of French television series
 Culture of France

References

Lists of animated television series
Animated